Port of New York may refer to:

Port of New York and New Jersey
Port Authority of New York and New Jersey
Port of New York (film), a 1949 American film